The Iron Woman is a novel of manners by the American writer Margaret Deland (1857–1945) set in the 19th century fictional locale of Mercer, an Ohio River community that represents Pittsburgh, Pennsylvania.

The novel tells the story of Mrs. Maitland, a leathery old widow who owns and operates an iron mill. Her devotion to a Puritanical work ethic alienates her son Blair, who though he stands to inherit the business, is headstrong and in love with Elizabeth Ferguson, a match Mrs. Maitland disapproves of.

It was first published in installments in Harper's Monthly from November 1910 through October 1911.

References

External links
The Iron Woman (1911) (Project Gutenberg Entry:) ( Internet Archive e-text)

1911 American novels
Novels set in Pittsburgh
Novels first published in serial form
Works originally published in Harper's Magazine
Harper & Brothers books
American novels adapted into films